The Backus Heritage Conservation Area is located in Norfolk County, Ontario, Canada.

Summary
The area contains the Backhouse Mill (known in French as Moulin-à-Farine Backhouse and containing the alternate name of Backhouse Grist Mill), a gristmill that was built in 1798. It was one of the few mills to not be burned during the War of 1812. The mill stayed in operation until 1957 and is now a national historic site.

The conservation area has facilities for both short-term and seasonal camping. This area is full of local history found in the Backhouse Homestead. In September, the area becomes the site of a reenactment of a battle during the War of 1812.

The Backus Mill Conservation Education Centre features exhibits about the area's natural history and traditions of waterfowl hunting.

The Heritage Village is an open-air museum that includes restored or reconstructed buildings and structures, including the 19th century Backhouse Homestead, Backhouse Mill, church, carriage shop, barn with agriculture equipment, drive shed with buggies and wagons, two log houses, schoolhouse, saw mill and farm and 19th century industrial equipment.  The Museum building includes exhibits about the Long Point Area, 19th century period business displays, and an exhibit about the shipwrecks of Lake Erie at Long Point.

It also features a fully lifeguarded pool.

References

External links
 Backus Mill Heritage and Conservation Centre - official site
 Backus Heritage Conservation Area at Ontariotravel.net
 Long Point Region Conservation Authority

1798 establishments in Canada
Mill museums in Canada
Museums in Norfolk County, Ontario
National Historic Sites in Ontario
Nature centres in Ontario
Open-air museums in Canada
Protected areas of Norfolk County, Ontario
Grinding mills in Canada
Industrial buildings in Ontario
History of Norfolk County, Ontario
Long Point Region Conservation Authority